Augsburg Arena, currently known commercially as the WWK Arena (officially stylised as WWK ARENA) is a football stadium in Augsburg, Bavaria, Germany. It is used mostly for football matches and hosts the home matches of FC Augsburg.

The stadium has a capacity of 30,660 with 19,060 seats and standing room for 11,034.  A second phase of construction could expand capacity to 49,000 in the future. It replaced the club's previous home stadium, Rosenaustadion. FC Augsburg played their first match in the new stadium in 2009

During the time of designing and constructing the stadium, it was called "Augsburg Arena" . It was opened as "Impuls Arena" (officially stylised as impuls arena), and was renamed "SGL Arena" (officially stylised as SGL arena) after SGL Carbon acquired the naming rights for the structure in May 2011. The contract had a term of seven years and began on 1 July 2011. On 1 July 2015 the stadium naming rights were acquired by WWK, an insurance company, changing the official name of the stadium to "WWK ARENA".

Augsburg was one of the official host cities of the 2010 FIFA U-20 Women's World Cup and the subsequent 2011 FIFA Women's World Cup. The Impuls arena was the location of several matches during the group stage and the quarterfinals. During the FIFA-competitions it was renamed "FIFA Women's World Cup Stadium Augsburg". The stadium has hosted one Germany national team game and was nicknamed the "Anfield of the B17 highway" following FCA's 2016 Europa League Last 32 First Leg clash with Liverpool.

WWK Arena is the first climate-neutral football stadium in the world. The carbon neutrality was achieved by six ecological heat pumps (40 m deep), which produce the desired temperature via heat exchangers. A bio natural gas boiler also supplies the necessary energy during peak load times at a game. In 2017, a new stadium facade will be made for the WWK Arena.

Gallery

References

External links

 Announcement of naming rights deal
 More stadium information
 Impuls Arena

Football venues in Germany
FC Augsburg
2011 FIFA Women's World Cup stadiums
Sports venues in Bavaria
Buildings and structures in Augsburg
Sports venues completed in 2009